Great Nephew (1963 – 31 May 1986) was a British thoroughbred who became a champion miler in France. He  also became a very successful sire, producing two Derby Stakes winners. He was trained as a 2yo and part of his 3yo career by Jack Jarvis. After finishing 2nd in the Two Thousand Guineas Stakes he was transferred to France to be trained by Etienne Pollet.

Stud career
Great Nephew sired many stakes winners, such as like  Champion Canadian Mare  Carotene and  ill-fated Derby winner  Shergar. He was Champion English Sire two times: once in 1975 and again in 1981. He Died on 31 May 1986 at Dalham Hall Stud Newmarket.

His Best Progeny:
Grundy ch. C (1972) - English Champion 2yo and Champion 3yo Colt, English and Irish Derby winner
Nikoli b. c. (1977) - Irish 2000 Guineas winner
 Mrs Penny chestnut filly (1977) – English Champion 2yo and 3yo Filly, Champion 3yo Filly in Ireland
Shergar b. C (1978) - European Horse of the Year, English and Irish Derby winner
 Tolmi, bay filly (1978), joint-top-rated European two-year-old filly
Carotene ch. F (1983) - Champion 3YO Turf Horse in Canada (1986, 1987, 1988)

References

1963 racehorse births
1986 racehorse deaths
Thoroughbred family 14-c
Racehorses bred in the United Kingdom
Racehorses trained in the United Kingdom
Racehorses trained in France